Bandits' Roost, 59 1/2 Mulberry Street is a black and white photograph produced by Danish American photographer and social reformer Jacob Riis, in 1888. The photograph was possibly taken not by Riis but by one of his assistant photographers, Henry G. Piffard or Richard Hoe Lawrence. It was first published in the photographic book How the Other Half Lives in 1889, which aimed to document the social conditions of the poorest people of New York.

Description
This photograph was taken in The Bend, a dangerous and poor alley in Mulberry Street, known for its crime ridden population, mostly of Italian origin. The picture conveys a menacing atmosphere, with the two men at the right appearing to guard the entrance of the alley, the second from the right holding a club. Other people appear in the image, including a man who sits in a staircase railing, near a woman, and another three men in the opposite side, looking in the direction of the camera. Some people lean from the windows, seemingly interested, at the right, while at the background clothing hangs on lines.

Riis' social activism in pursuit of better life conditions for the poorest classes of New York, of which the book where this picture was published was one of the best examples, helped demolished Mulberry End, which would be later replaced by a park.

Cultural references
Riis' work served as an inspiration and this photograph in particular was recreated in a scene of the film Gangs of New York (2002), by Martin Scorsese, which takes place two decades before its making.

Public collections
There are prints of this photograph at the Museum of Modern Art, in New York, the Museum of the City of New York, the International Center of Photography, in New York, and at the Ackland Art Museum, in Chapel Hill.

See also
 List of photographs considered the most important

References

1888 works
1888 in art
1880s photographs
Photographs by Jacob Riis
Black-and-white photographs
Photographs of the Museum of Modern Art (New York City)